Battle Beast is a Finnish heavy/power metal band established in Helsinki in 2008 by Anton Kabanen, Juuso Soinio and Pyry Vikki. The initial line-up consisted of guitarists Soinio and Kabanen, and drummer Vikki, who were high school friends. The rest of the original lineup, bassist Eero Sipilä, keyboardist Janne Björkroth and lead singer Nitte Valo, joined the band after auditions.

History
Before gaining a record contract, Battle Beast was best known for having won two major band competitions in year 2010: the international Wacken Metal Battle 2010, participated by thousands of bands from all around the world, whose final stage was held at the famed German metal festival Wacken Open Air; soon after that, the band was announced the winner of Radio Rock Starba, a band competition held by the major Finnish radio station Radio Rock. With its victory in the Finnish competition, the band received intense media exposure, and before the end of 2010 they had signed a record deal with the Finnish label Hype Records.

Battle Beast's first album, titled Steel, was released in Finland in Spring 2011. With the support of the two singles, "Show Me How to Die" and "Enter the Metal World", and their heavy airplay on Radio Rock, the album peaked at No. 7 upon its release. Although released only in Finland, the album soon caught the attention of the international metal label Nuclear Blast, with whom the band signed a licensing deal in late 2011. A reissue of Steel, which included one bonus track, was released to the European market in January 2012. The band was voted at the third place in the list for Newcomer Of The Year 2011 at the Finnish Metal Awards in February 2012. To support the European release of Steel, Battle Beast toured for the first time as opening act for their countrymen Nightwish in many European dates of the Imaginaerum World Tour. The tour was reported a success by both bands. On the final show of the tour Nightwish paid their respects to the support band by performing a cover of "Show Me How to Die" as a part of their acoustic set.

In autumn of 2012, after touring Finnish rock festivals during the summer, Nitte Valo was announced to be leaving the band because of family issues. New singer candidates appeared both in Finland and abroad. Noora Louhimo from Tampere, Finland was chosen as the new lead singer, with Kabanen having originally found her “by accident while browsing YouTube”. With Louhimo in the band, Battle Beast started another European tour in November, this time supporting the Finnish power metal band Sonata Arctica.

After the tour, the band immediately went into studio to record their second album. The label Hype Productions had gone out of business and the band moved on to Warner Music Finland, with Nuclear Blast still handling international releases. The first single with Noora Louhimo on vocals, "Into the Heart of Danger" was released on 26 April 2013, followed by the album Battle Beast on 17 May 2013. Another single and a music video for the song "Black Ninja" was released to coincide with the release of the album. The album topped the sales of its predecessor easily, peaking at No. 5 and staying on the charts for 17 weeks. The album also charted on various European countries including Germany. The following autumn Battle Beast headed on another European tour, this time supporting the German bands Powerwolf and U.D.O.

In January 2014, Battle Beast was announced one of the five nominees for the best Finnish metal album in the national Emma-gaala awards.

In January 2015, Battle Beast released its third album, Unholy Savior, topping the Finnish album chart on its release week. Soon after a European tour supporting Sabaton, in February 2015 the band parted ways with Anton Kabanen with both parties citing musical disagreements and other unsolvable issues within the band. He was replaced by Ossi Maristo and keyboardist Janne Björkroth's brother, Joona Björkroth, on a sessional basis. Joona Björkroth became a permanent member in 2016. Kabanen went on to form Beast In Black.

The first single with the renewed line-up "King For a Day" was released in January 2016, immediately picking up heavy airplay in Finland's Radio Rock, followed by another single "Familiar Hell" in early 2017. Battle Beast released their fourth album Bringer of Pain on February 17, 2017 again topping the charts in their homeland. The album was also its first to reach the top 20 in Germany, debuting at #14 on its release week. Following the release of Bringer of Pain, Battle Beast went on a 5+ week European tour with support from Majesty and GYZE. It toured for the first time in North America that spring, supporting Sabaton's "The Last Tour" with Leaves' Eyes. The band performed in Japan for the first time in September 2017.

On 22 March 2019, Battle Beast released their fifth studio album, No More Hollywood Endings.

On 4 October 2021, the band announced their sixth studio album, Circus of Doom. It was released on 21 January 2022.

Members
 Juuso Soinio – rhythm guitar (2008–present)
 Pyry Vikki – drums (2008–present)
 Eero Sipilä – bass, backing vocals (2008–present)
 Janne Björkroth – keytar, backing vocals (2008–present)
 Noora Louhimo – lead vocals (2012–present)
 Joona Björkroth – lead guitar, backing vocals (2015–Present)
Former members
 Nitte Valo – lead vocals (2008–2012)
 Anton Kabanen – lead guitar, backing vocals (2008–2015)
Touring members
 Ossi Maristo – lead guitar (2015)
 Otte Aho - lead guitar (2022)

Timeline

Discography

Albums

Singles
 "Show Me How to Die" (2011)
 "Enter the Metal World" (2011)
 "Into the Heart of Danger" (2013)
 "Black Ninja" (2013)
 "Touch in the Night" (2014)
 "Madness" (2014)
 "King for a Day" (2016)
 "Familiar Hell" (2017)
 "Bringer of Pain (2017)
 "No More Hollywood Endings" (2019)
 "Eden" (2019)
 "Endless Summer" (2019)
 "The Golden Horde" (2019)
 "Master of Illusion" (2021)
 "Eye of the Storm" (2021)
 "Where Angels Fear to Fly" (2022)
 "Wings Of Light" (2022)

References

External links
 Official website
 Battle Beast profile at Nuclear Blast

2008 establishments in Finland
Finnish power metal musical groups
Finnish heavy metal musical groups
Musical groups established in 2008
Musical groups from Helsinki
Nuclear Blast artists